The greenhouse effect is a process that occurs after energy from a planet's host star goes through the planet's atmosphere and heats the planet's surface. When the planet radiates the heat back out as infrared radiation, greenhouse gases in the atmosphere absorb some of the heat and then radiate some of it back down towards the planet, warming it. Without the greenhouse effect, the Earth's average surface temperature would be about  compared to Earth's actual average surface temperature of approximately 14 °C (57.2 °F). In addition to the naturally present greenhouse gases, human-caused increases in greenhouse gases are trapping greater amounts of heat. Burning fossil fuels has increased atmospheric carbon dioxide by about 50% over pre-industrial levels, which is the primary driver for global warming.

Matter radiates energy at a wavelength related to its temperature. Different gases absorb different wavelengths of radiation. Earth's atmosphere is made of gases that are transparent to visible wavelengths of light, allowing sunlight through to heat the surface. Most gases in the atmosphere are also transparent to infrared radiation, but a small proportion of the atmosphere is made up of greenhouse gases that absorb it. These greenhouse gas molecules absorb some of the heat the Earth emits and then re-emit the heat in all directions, passing it to the surrounding air and warming other greenhouse gas molecules. Heat radiated downwards further increases the temperature of the surface, which then returns heat to the atmosphere in a positive feedback cycle.

A runaway greenhouse effect occurs when greenhouse gases accumulate in the atmosphere through a positive feedback cycle to such an extent that they substantially block radiated heat from escaping into space, thus preventing the planet from cooling. A runaway greenhouse effect involving carbon dioxide and water vapor appears to have occurred on Venus. However, it is unlikely that human-caused greenhouse gas emissions alone could trigger a runaway effect on Earth.

The term greenhouse effect comes from a flawed analogy to greenhouses. The primary way greenhouses retain energy from the sun is by preventing the movement of air (blocking convection), although their panels also retain heat by limiting heat radiation and conduction.

History 

The existence of the greenhouse effect, while not named as such, was proposed by Joseph Fourier in 1824. The argument and the evidence were further strengthened by Claude Pouillet in 1827 and 1838. In 1856 Eunice Newton Foote demonstrated that the warming effect of the sun is greater for air with water vapour than for dry air, and the effect is even greater with carbon dioxide. She concluded that "An atmosphere of that gas would give to our earth a high temperature..." John Tyndall was the first to measure the infrared absorption and emission of various gases and vapors. From 1859 onwards, he showed that the effect was due to a very small proportion of the atmosphere, with the main gases having no effect, and was largely due to water vapor, though small percentages of hydrocarbons and carbon dioxide had a significant effect. The effect was more fully quantified by Svante Arrhenius in 1896, who made the first quantitative prediction of global warming due to a hypothetical doubling of atmospheric carbon dioxide. However, the term "greenhouse" was not used to refer to this effect by any of these scientists; the term was first used in this way by Nils Gustaf Ekholm in 1901.

Definition 
The greenhouse effect is defined as follows:The infrared radiative effect of all infrared-absorbing constituents in the atmosphere. Greenhouse gases (GHGs), clouds, and some aerosols absorb terrestrial radiation emitted by the Earth's surface and elsewhere in the atmosphere. These substances emit infrared radiation in all directions, but, everything else being equal, the net amount emitted to space is normally less than would have been emitted in the absence of these absorbers because of the decline of temperature with altitude in the troposphere and the consequent weakening of emission. An increase in the concentration of GHGs increases the magnitude of this effect; the difference is sometimes called the enhanced greenhouse effect. The change in a GHG concentration because of anthropogenic emissions contributes to an instantaneous radiative forcing. Earth's surface temperature and troposphere warm in response to this forcing, gradually restoring the radiative balance at the top of the atmosphere.Earth receives energy from the Sun in the form of ultraviolet, visible, and near-infrared radiation. About 26% of the incoming solar energy is reflected back to space by the atmosphere and clouds, and 19% is absorbed by the atmosphere and clouds. Most of the remaining energy is absorbed at the surface of Earth. Because the Earth's surface is colder than the Sun, it radiates at wavelengths that are much longer than the wavelengths that were absorbed. Most of this thermal radiation is absorbed by the atmosphere and warms it. The atmosphere also gains heat by sensible and latent heat fluxes from the surface. The atmosphere radiates energy both upwards and downwards; the part radiated downwards is absorbed by the surface of Earth. This leads to a higher equilibrium temperature than if the atmosphere did not radiate.

The greenhouse effect is the contribution of greenhouse gases and aerosols to this difference, with imperfect modelling of clouds being the main uncertainty.

Details 
The idealized greenhouse model is a simplification. In reality, the atmosphere near the Earth's surface is largely opaque to thermal radiation and most heat loss from the surface is by convection. However radiative energy losses become increasingly important higher in the atmosphere, largely because of the decreasing concentration of water vapor, an important greenhouse gas. Rather than the surface itself, it is more realistic to think of the greenhouse effect as applying to a layer in the mid-troposphere, which is effectively coupled to the surface by a lapse rate. A simple picture also assumes a steady state, but in the real world, the diurnal cycle, as well as the seasonal cycle and weather disturbances, complicate matters. Solar heating applies only during daytime. At night the atmosphere cools somewhat, but not greatly because the thermal inertia of the climate system resists changes both day and night, as well as for longer periods. Diurnal temperature changes decrease with height in the atmosphere.

Within the region where radiative effects are important, the description given by the idealized greenhouse model becomes realistic. At these wavelengths, greenhouse gases that were largely transparent to incoming solar radiation are more absorbent. Each layer of the atmosphere with greenhouse gases absorbs some of the heat being radiated upwards from lower layers. It reradiates in all directions, both upwards and downwards; in equilibrium (by definition) the same amount as it has absorbed. This results in more warmth below. Increasing the concentration of the gases increases the amount of absorption and re-radiation, and thereby further warms the layers and ultimately the surface below.

Greenhouse gases—including most diatomic gases with two different atoms (such as carbon monoxide, CO) and all gases with three or more atoms—are able to absorb and emit infrared radiation. Though more than 99% of the dry atmosphere is IR transparent (because the main constituents—, and Ar—are not able to directly absorb or emit infrared radiation), intermolecular collisions cause the energy absorbed and emitted by the greenhouse gases to be shared with the other, non-IR-active, gases.

Examples in the atmosphere

Greenhouse gases 

A greenhouse gas (GHG) is a gas capable of trapping solar radiation energy within a planet's atmosphere. Greenhouse gases contribute most of the greenhouse effect in Earth's energy budget.

Greenhouse gases can be divided into two types, direct and indirect. Gases that can directly absorb solar energy are direct greenhouse gases, e.g., water vapor, carbon dioxide and ozone. The molecules of these gases can directly absorb solar radiation at certain ranges of wavelength. Some gases are indirect greenhouse gases, as they do not absorb solar energy directly or significantly, but have capability of producing other greenhouse gases. For example, methane plays an important role in producing tropospheric ozone and formation of more carbon dioxide. NOx and CO can also produce tropospheric ozone and carbon dioxide through photochemical processes.
By their percentage contribution to the overall greenhouse effect on Earth, the four major greenhouse gases are:
 Water vapor (H2O), 36~72% (~75% including clouds);
 Carbon dioxide (CO2), 9~26%;
 Methane (CH4), 4~9%;
 Tropospheric ozone (O3), 3~7%.

It is not practical to assign a specific percentage to each gas because the absorption and emission bands of the gases overlap (hence the ranges given above). A water molecule only stays in the atmosphere for an average 8 to 10 days, which corresponds with high variability in the contribution from clouds and humidity at any particular time and location.

There are other influential gases that contribute to the greenhouse effect, including nitrous oxide (N2O), perfluorocarbons (PFCs), chlorofluorocarbons (CFCs), hydrofluorocarbons (HFCs), and sulfur hexafluoride (SF6). These gases are mostly produced through human activities, thus they have played important parts in climate change.

Concentration change of greenhouse gases from 1750 to 2019 (ppm: parts per million; ppb: parts per billion):

 Carbon dioxide (CO2), 278.3 to 409.9 ppm, up 47%;
 Methane (CH4), 729.2 to 1866.3 ppb, up 156%;
 Nitrous oxide (N2O), 270.1 to 332.1 ppb, up 23%.

The global warming potential (GWP) of a greenhouse gas is calculated by quantifying the lifetime and the efficiency of greenhouse effect of the gas. Typically, nitrous oxide has a lifetime of about 121 years, and over 270 times higher GWP than carbon dioxide for 20-year time span. Sulfur hexafluoride has a lifetime of over 3000 years and 25000 times higher GWP than carbon dioxide.

Clouds 

Clouds play an important part in global radiative balance and thin cirrus clouds have some greenhouse effects. They can absorb and emit infrared radiation and thus affect the radiative properties of the atmosphere. Clouds include liquid clouds, mixed-phase clouds and ice clouds. Liquid clouds are low clouds and have negative radiative forcing. Mixed-phase clouds are clouds coexisted with both liquid water and solid ice at subfreezing temperatures and their radiative properties (optical depth or optical thickness) are substantially influenced by the liquid content. Ice clouds are high clouds and their radiative forcing depends on the ice crystal number concentration, cloud thickness and ice water content.

The radiative properties of liquid clouds depend strongly on cloud microphysical properties, such as cloud liquid water content and cloud drop size distribution. The liquid clouds with higher liquid water content and smaller water droplets will have a stronger negative radiative forcing. The cloud liquid contents are usually related to the surface and atmospheric circulations. Over the warm ocean, the atmosphere is usually rich with water vapor and thus the liquid clouds contain higher liquid water content. When the moist air flows converge in the clouds and generate strong updrafts, the water content can be much higher. Aerosols will influence the cloud drop size distribution. For example, in the polluted industrial regions with lots of aerosols, the water droplets in liquid clouds are often small.

The mixed phase clouds have negative radiative forcing. The radiative forcing of mix-phase clouds has a larger uncertainty than liquid clouds. One reason is that the microphysics are much more complicated because the coexistence of both liquid and solid water. For example, Wegener–Bergeron–Findeisen process can deplete large amounts of water droplets and enlarge small ice crystals to large ones in a short period of time. Hallett-Mossop process will shatter the liquid droplets in the collision with large ice crystals and freeze into a lot of small ice splinters. The cloud radiative properties can change dramatically during these processes because small ice crystals can reflect much more sun lights and generate larger negative radiative forcing, compared with large water droplets.

Cirrus clouds can either enhance or reduce the greenhouse effects, depending on the cloud thickness. Thin cirrus is usually considered to have positive radiative forcing and thick cirrus has negative radiative forcing. Ice water content and ice size distribution also determines cirrus radiative properties. The larger ice water content is, the more cooling effects cirrus have. When cloud ice water contents are the same, cirrus with more smaller ice crystals have larger cooling effects, compared with cirrus with fewer larger ice crystals. Some scientists suggest doing some cirrus seeding into thin cirrus clouds in order to decrease the size of ice crystals and thus reduce their greenhouse effects, but some other studies doubt its efficiency and think it would be useless to fight with global warming.

Aerosols 

Atmospheric aerosols are typically defined as suspensions of liquid, solid, or mixed particles with various chemical and physical properties, which play a really important role in modulating earth energy budget that will further cause climate change. There are two major sources of the atmospheric aerosols, one is natural sources, and the other is anthropogenic sources. For example, desert dust, sea salt, volcanic ash, volatile organic compounds (VOC) from vegetation and smoke from forest fire are some of the important natural sources of aerosols. For the aerosols that are generated from human activities, such as fossil fuel burning, deforestation fires, and burning of agricultural waste, are considered as anthropogenic aerosols. The amount of anthropogenic aerosols has been dramatically increases since preindustrial times, which is considered as a major contribution to the global air pollution. Since these aerosols have different chemical composition and physical properties, they can produce different Radiative forcing effect to warm or cool the global climate.

Impact of atmospheric aerosols on climate can be classified as direct or indirect with respect to radiative forcing of the climate system. Aerosols can directly scatter and absorb solar and infrared radiance in the atmosphere, hence it has a direct radiative forcing to the global climate system. Aerosols can also act as cloud condensation nuclei (CCN) to form clouds, resulting in changing the formation and precipitation efficiency of liquid water, ice and mixed phase clouds, thereby causing an indirect radiative forcing associated with these changes in cloud properties.

Aerosols that mainly scatter solar radiation can reflect solar radiation back to space, which will cause cooling effect to the global climate. All of the atmospheric aerosols have such capability to scatter incoming solar radiation. But only a few types of aerosols can absorb solar radiation, such as Black carbon (BC), organic carbon (OC) and mineral dust, which can induce non negligible warming effect to the Earth atmosphere. The emission of black carbon is really large in the developing countries, such as China and India, and this increase trend is still expected to continue. Black carbon can be transported over long distances, and mixed with other aerosols along the way.The solar-absorption efficiency has positive correlation with the ratio of black carbon to sulphate, thus people should focus both on the black carbon emissions and the atmospheric ratio of carbon to sulphate. Particle size and mixing ratio can not only determine the absorption efficiency of BC, but also affect the lifetime of BC. The surface albedo of the surfaces covered by snow or ice could be reduced due to the deposition of these kinds of absorbing aerosol, which will also cause heating effect. The heating effect from black carbon at high elevations is just important as carbon dioxide in the melting of snowpacks and glaciers. In addition to these absorbing aerosols, it is found that the stratospheric aerosol can also induce strong local warming effect by increasing long wave radiation to the surface and reducing the outgoing longwave radiation.

Role in climate change 

Strengthening of the greenhouse effect through human activities is known as the enhanced (or anthropogenic) greenhouse effect.  As well as being inferred from measurements by the CERES satellite throughout the 21st century, this increase in radiative forcing from human activity has been observed directly, and is attributable mainly to increased atmospheric carbon dioxide levels. According to the 2014 Assessment Report  from the Intergovernmental Panel on Climate Change, "atmospheric concentrations of carbon dioxide, methane and nitrous oxide are unprecedented in at least the last 800,000 years. Their effects, together with those of other anthropogenic drivers, have been detected throughout the climate system and are extremely likely to have been the dominant cause of the observed warming since the mid-20th century'".

 is produced by fossil fuel burning and other activities such as cement production and tropical deforestation. The current observed amount of  exceeds the geological record maxima (≈300 ppm) from ice core data. The effect of combustion-produced carbon dioxide on the global climate, a special case of the greenhouse effect first described in 1896 by Svante Arrhenius, has also been called the Callendar effect.

Over the past 800,000 years, ice core data shows that carbon dioxide has varied from values as low as 180 ppm to the pre-industrial level of 270 ppm. Paleoclimatologists consider variations in carbon dioxide concentration to be a fundamental factor influencing climate variations over this time scale.

Real greenhouses 

The "greenhouse effect" of the atmosphere is named by analogy to greenhouses which become warmer in sunlight. However, a greenhouse is not primarily warmed by the "greenhouse effect".
"Greenhouse effect" is actually a misnomer since heating in the usual greenhouse is due to the reduction of convection, while the "greenhouse effect" works by preventing absorbed heat from leaving the structure through radiative transfer.

A greenhouse is built of any material that passes sunlight: usually glass or plastic. The sun warms the ground and contents inside just like the outside, and these then warm the air. Outside, the warm air near the surface rises and mixes with cooler air aloft, keeping the temperature lower than inside, where the air continues to heat up because it is confined within the greenhouse. This can be demonstrated by opening a small window near the roof of a greenhouse: the temperature will drop considerably. It was demonstrated experimentally (R. W. Wood, 1909) that a (not heated) "greenhouse" with a cover of rock salt (which is transparent to infrared) heats up an enclosure similarly to one with a glass cover. Thus greenhouses work primarily by preventing convective cooling.

Heated greenhouses are yet another matter: as they have an internal source of heating, it is desirable to minimize the amount of heat leaking out by radiative cooling. This can be done through the use of adequate glazing.

It is possible in theory to build a greenhouse that lowers its thermal emissivity during dark hours; such a greenhouse would trap heat by two different physical mechanisms, combining multiple greenhouse effects, one of which more closely resembles the atmospheric mechanism, rendering the misnomer debate moot.

Related effects

Anti-greenhouse effect

The anti-greenhouse effect is a mechanism similar and symmetrical to the greenhouse effect: in the greenhouse effect, the atmosphere lets radiation in while not letting thermal radiation out, thus warming the body surface; in the anti-greenhouse effect, the atmosphere keeps radiation out while letting thermal radiation out, which lowers the equilibrium surface temperature. Such an effect has been proposed for Saturn's moon Titan.

Runaway greenhouse effect

A runaway greenhouse effect occurs if positive feedbacks lead to the evaporation of all greenhouse gases into the atmosphere. A runaway greenhouse effect involving carbon dioxide and water vapor has long ago been hypothesized to have occurred on Venus, this idea is still largely accepted. The planet Venus experienced  a runaway greenhouse effect, resulting in an atmosphere which is 96% carbon dioxide, and a surface atmospheric pressure roughly the same as found  underwater on Earth. Venus may have had water oceans, but they would have boiled off as the mean surface temperature rose to the current .

A 2012 journal article stated that almost all lines of evidence indicate that is unlikely to be possible to trigger a full runaway greenhouse on Earth, merely by adding greenhouse gases to the atmosphere. However, the authors cautioned that "our understanding of the dynamics, thermodynamics, radiative transfer and cloud physics of hot and steamy atmospheres is weak", and that we "cannot therefore completely rule out the possibility that human actions might cause a transition, if not to full runaway, then at least to a much warmer climate state than the present one". A 2013 article concluded that runaway greenhouse "could in theory be triggered by increased greenhouse forcing", but that "anthropogenic emissions are probably insufficient".

Bodies other than Earth 
Apart from the Earth, there are other planets in the solar system that also have greenhouse effect. This is due to several reasons:
 It is nearer to the Sun than Earth by about 30%.
 Its very dense atmosphere consists mainly of carbon dioxide, approximately 97%.
"Venus experienced a runaway greenhouse effect in the past, and we expect that Earth will in about 2 billion years as solar luminosity increases".

Titan is a body with both a greenhouse effect and an anti-greenhouse effect. The presence of N2, CH4, and H2 in the atmosphere contribute to a greenhouse effect, increasing the surface temperature by 21K over the expected temperature of the body with no atmosphere. The existence of a high-altitude haze, which absorbs wavelengths of solar radiation but is transparent to infrared, contribute to an anti-greenhouse effect of approximately 9K. The net effect of these two phenomena result is a net warming of 21K - 9K = 12K, so Titan is 12 K warmer than it would be if there were no atmosphere.

See also

Top contributors to greenhouse gas emissions
Lapse rate
Climate change feedback
Climate tipping point
Radiative forcing
Global dimming
Intergovernmental Panel on Climate Change
United Nations Framework Convention on Climate Change

References

Further reading

External links 

 Rutgers University: Earth Radiation Budget 

Atmosphere
Atmospheric radiation
Climate forcing
Effects of climate change
Atmospheric chemistry